Govind Purushottam Deshpande (1938 – 16 October 2013) was a Marathi playwright and academic from Maharashtra, India.

Biography

Education and career

Born in Nashik, Deshpande grew up in Rahimatpur, where he went to school. He completed an MA in Ancient Indian History from Maharaja Sayajirao University of Baroda, and enrolled for a Ph.D. at the School of International Affairs, New Delhi. This school subsequently became part of the Jawaharlal Nehru University. Deshpande completed his Ph.D. and later taught at the Centre for East Asian Studies at the Jawaharlal Nehru University in New Delhi. He lived in Pune after retirement. He suffered a brain hemorrhage in July 2013 and was hospitalized. He died at home on 16 October 2013.

Writing
Deshpande wrote a column in the Economic and Political Weekly for four decades. His collection of essays on culture and politics, Dialectics of Defeat: Problems of Culture in Post-Colonial India (Seagull, Kolkata), was published in 2006, and he also issued a collection of poems, Ityadi Ityadi Kavita (Etc. etc. poems).
He was the editor of the anthology of Indian plays in translation, Modern Indian Drama, published by Sahitya Akademi, 2004.

Awards and recognition

Deshpande received the Maharashtra State Award for his collective work in 1977 and the Sangeet Natak Akademi Award for playwrighting in 1996.

Family

Deshpande's wife, Kalindi, is a women's rights activist. His daughter, Ashwini, is an economist at the Delhi School of Economics, and his son, Sudhanva, is a publisher with LeftWord Books and a theatre activist with Jana Natya Manch, Delhi. Marathi stage and film actor Jyoti Subhash is his sister, and her daughter Amruta, also an actor, is his niece.

Notable plays
 Udhwastha Dharmashala (published in English as A Man in Dark Times), directed by Dr Shreeram Lagoo (Marathi), Om Puri (Hindi), Rajinder Nath (Hindi), Shyamanand Jalan (Padatik) in 1982.
 Andhar Yatra (A Journey in Darkness), directed in Marathi by Satyadev Dubey and in Hindi by Rajinder Nath.
 Satyashodhak (The Truth Seeker) on the life and times of the 19th-century social reformer Jotiba Phule, directed by Sudhanva Deshpande and performed by Jana Natya Manch. The Marathi productions were directed by Sharad Bhuthadia (Kolhapur) and Atul Pethe (Pune), who also directed a Kannada production in Heggodu.
 Antim Divas directed by G.P. Deshpande for Padatik in Kolkata (in Hindi) and by Jyoti Subhash in Marathi.
 Chanakya Vishnugupta directed by Satyadev Dubey for the National School of Drama in Hindi with Ashish Vidyarthi and Baharul Islam in the title roles, and by Dr Shreeram Lagoo in Marathi with himself in the title role.
 Music System directed by Vijay Kenkre in Marathi.
 Raastey directed in Marathi by Vijay Kenkre, and Hindi by Jyoti Subhash, directed by Satyadev Dubey for the National School of Drama Repertory Company, and by Arvind Gaur.

References

1938 births
2013 deaths
20th-century Indian linguists
Indian male dramatists and playwrights
Dramatists and playwrights from Maharashtra
Marathi-language writers
Recipients of the Sangeet Natak Akademi Award
Academic staff of Jawaharlal Nehru University
20th-century Indian dramatists and playwrights
20th-century Indian male writers